Loretta Nellie Clemens Tupper (May 6, 1906 – September 17, 1990) was an American singer, pianist and vaudevillian and radio actress., who later added television and film appearances to her impressive repertoire. In her early career she was known as Loretta Clemens and in her later career she was known as Loretta Tupper  She featured in numerous television commercials and was famous for playing the old lady in the Fruit of the Loom television commercials from the 1980s.  She was a character on the PBS Television show Sesame Street called Mrs. Mae Trump in the 1980s. She played small roles in numerous movies.

Early career 
In the early 1930s, Loretta and her brother Jack Clemens played music in a band called Loretta and Jack. They recorded a number of songs including "Stop! You're Breaking My Heart" from the album Jazz Guitar Varieties, written by Ted Koehler and Burton Lane, "(What Did I Do To Be So) Black and Blue" written by Harry Brooks and Andy Razaf and composed by Thomas "Fats" Waller, from the album Jazz Guitar Varieties and "Just A Little Girl" written by S. B. Fishburne. In the early 1930s Loretta was a member of a trio band called The Triolettes, along with Eunice Miller and Marjorie Sullivan.

Recordings 
Title                                     Artist                          Company	Number		Speed/Size	 	Recording Date		With/From

Who's Afraid of the Big Bad Wolf?     Loretta Clemens Tupper		Perfect	15827-A		78  10-in.	    09/23/1933		(Harry Reiser and his Eskimos)

Way out West                           Jack and Loretta Clemens	    Victor	BS-07923	78	10-in.	    04/23/1937		(From Babes in Arms)

The Lady is a Tramp                    Jack and Loretta Clemens	    Victor	BS-07924	78	10-in.	    04/23/1937	

Cat's Serenade                         Loretta Clemens Tupper 	    Victor	BS-055548	78	10-in.	    08/27/1940		(Xavier Cugat Waldorf-Astoria Orchestra)

Radio Programs and Movies 
Jack and Loretta Clemens also starred in The Gibson Family, an hour-long musical comedy radio series on NBC from 1934 to 1935. The program did not do well in the ratings, and in 1935 it was reworked and renamed Uncle Charlie's Tent Show.  While the format had changed, many of the characters from The Gibson Family were in the new version of the show.  Jack and Loretta Clemens remained on the show, playing the same characters that they played originally. Uncle Charlie's Tent Show was broadcast for less than three months before it too was canceled.

From 1933 through 1939 Jack and Loretta Clemens had their own program, Jack and Loretta Clemens, a brother-sister piano-patter-and-song-duo broadcast on various networks including NBC, CBS, Blue Network and Blue. The program was 15 minutes long and was broadcast up to six times per week.

Between 1934 and 1937 Loretta sang on the NBC radio program Johnny Presents. They performed in the 1936 short film Towers of Melody and managed to add a reference to the song The Big Bad Wolf recorded for Disney's The Three Little Pigs.  In 1936 Jack and Loretta starred in the radio program Studio 7, which aired three times a week on NBC. They played themselves in the 1937 musical film Vitaphone Frolics.

Personal life, later career and awards 
Sometime during the 1930s Loretta married violinist, jazz musician, and big band arranger Fredrick H. Tupper who was born October 5, 1904, and died May 31, 1974. She studied at Western Reserve University. In 1942, she gave birth to her daughter, Rettadel Tupper, and decided to semi-retire from show business. She opened a talent school in Queens, New York, where she taught future stars, including Eileen Brennan. In 1969 the father of one of her students took some photos of her and sent them to some agents in New York.  Shortly after that, Mrs. Tupper had her first new acting role advertising Parker Pens. After the death of her husband, she returned to show business, and appeared in numerous television commercials and small film roles. Directors nicknamed her One-Take Tupper for her ability to complete her part in just one take.  In 1977 she won a Clio award for her first Fruit of the Loom commercial.  She was in numerous commercials including Hertz, The New York Yankees, Midas Mufflers, Audi and Morton's Doughnuts. In 1985 she won another Clio award for her work in a commercial for the Baltimore Orioles. She worked steadily until the last two years of her life.

In 1985, she had a small role as a music shop owner in Woody Allen's film The Purple Rose of Cairo.

References 

General sources
Pancakes and Patter, by Dora Albert. The Oakland Tribune (Oakland, California) Dated March 8, 1936. This article is a full-page story about the lives and careers of Jack and Loretta Clemens.

Americas Favorite Granny, by Diane Casselberry Manuel. The Chronicle-Telegram (Elyria, Ohio) Dated November 7, 1982. This article is a full-page story about the life of Loretta Clemens Tupper.

Obituary for Frederick H. Tupper.  The New York Times (New York City, New York) Dated June 3, 1974.

Between Broadway, by Boarman Byrd.  The Miami News (Miami, Florida) Dated June 8, 1937.

 The Cover Portrait From the publication Radio Guide Pg 15, Dated August 22, 1936.

External links 
  Loretta Clemens Tupper IMDB
  Loretta Clemens Tupper NY Times Obituary
  On the Air: The Encyclopedia of Old-Time Radio By John Dunning
  Discography of American Historical Recordings

Actresses from New York (state)
Vaudeville performers
1906 births
1990 deaths
Actresses from Ohio
20th-century American actresses
People from Ottawa County, Ohio